Bibras Natcho (Adyghe: Пыйпэрыс Натхъо, ; born 18 February 1988) is an Israeli professional footballer who plays as a central midfielder for Serbian club Partizan and captains the Israel national team. He is the first captain of Israel to be of either Circassian or Muslim origin.

He also holds Serbian citizenship.

Early and personal life
Natcho was born in Kfar Kama, Israel, to a Circassian-Israeli Muslim family. His father Akram Natkho served in the Israel Border Police, and died of cardiac arrest in 2008. His cousin, Circassian-Israeli basketball player Nili Natkho, died in 2004 in a car accident in northern Israel. Their grandfather moved from Turkey to what was then British Mandate of Palestine (now Israel). His younger cousin Amir Natkho joined CSKA in 2015 as well. His uncle, Amir's father, Adam Natkho is also a former footballer from Russia.

He is married to Circassian-Israeli Talia Achmiz, and together they have three children. His eldest son was born in 2012 and is named after Natcho's late father.

Club career

Hapoel Tel Aviv
Natcho joined Hapoel Tel Aviv's youth team together with Ben Sahar, moving through the ranks up to the first team at the start of the 2006–07 season, winning the State Cup during that season. Throughout the years, Natcho became an important player in Hapoel and in the Israeli national youth teams. Natcho made his League debut coming on as a substitute against Maccabi Netanya F.C. on 18 November 2006. Natcho's first professional goal was against NK Široki Brijeg during the 2nd leg of the 2007–08 UEFA Cup second qualifying round at Bloomfield Stadium. After the arrival of coach Eli Guttman during the 2007–08 season, Natcho became a main part of the team, scoring his first league goal against Maccabi Petah Tikva F.C. on 9 February 2008. Natcho made a few impressive performances at the beginning of the 2009–10 UEFA Europa League helping Hapoel finish top of Group C, ending the European campaign drawing 0–0 on a raining evening and losing 0–3 away at the Central Stadium.

Rubin Kazan

After losing 3–0 on aggregate in the Round of 32 of Europa League, Natcho moved to the eventual "European Dream" killers Rubin Kazan on 8 March 2010, signing a four-year deal with this Russian club. with transfer fee of €650,000 paid to Hapoel Tel Aviv.

Natcho then scored his first goal for the club, on 17 April 2010, in a 1–0 win over Amkar Perm. His second goal came in a 2–1 win over Rostov on 16 October 2010. However, injuries limited his playing time, as he made fourteen appearances and scored twice.
 

Natcho started the 2011–12 season well in all competitions, scoring his first goal on 27 May 2011, in a 4–1 win over Tom Tomsk. His second goal of the season came on 14 June 2011, in a 3–0 win over Dynamo Moscow. As a result of his performance, Natcho was named Team of The Week Matchday 13. Elsewhere, Natcho scored two goals in the Champions League qualifier against Dynamo Kyiv and Lyon, who they eliminated Kazan out of the competitions and the club would play in the Europa League. Then in the Europa League campaign, Natcho scored twice in six matches in the Group Stage of the Europa League against Tottenham Hostpur and Shamrock Rovers. Natcho performance was praised for his role during the season and helped the club win the Russian Cup after playing a vital of assisting the winning goal, in a 1–0 win over Dynamo Moscow. Natcho made 56 appearances and scored fourteen appearances in all competitions. Also at the end of the year, Natcho was voted by the club's supporters as the best player of the year.

At the start of the 2012–13 season, Natcho continuously made a good start for the club when he scored six goals in the first six matches against Krasnodar, twice against Alania Vladikavkaz, Dynamo Moscow, Spartak Moscow and Zenit Saint Petersburg. Soon after, Natcho started negotiating over a new three-year contract with the club that would keep him until 2016. However, the negotiations changed again to a one-year contract a month later. Despite a contract negotiations, which is yet reported, Natcho scored his sixth goal of the season, on 11 November 2012, in a 2–0 win over Krylia Sovetov Samara. It would later be revealed that the  delay to Natcho's new contract was over the future of Manager Kurban Berdyev. In the quarter final of the Europa League, Natcho scored two goals (both coming from penalty) in both legs, as Rubin Kazan lose 5–4 on aggregate against Chelsea. Natcho would add two more goals later in the season against Lokomotiv Moscow and Krasndor. At the end of the 2012–13 season, Natcho wasn't only named by Sports.ru as one of the top players in the Russian league, but team of the year. However, Natcho's agent revealed that Natcho had yet to reach an agreement over a new contract.

In the 2013–14 season, Natcho started his season when he scored in the second round of first leg of the Europa League, in a 3–2 win over Jagodina. Rubin Kazan would win in the return leg and would progress to the Group Stage. With his uncertainty of his future, as his contract with the club expires in six months time, it announced that Natcho would stay at the club for the remaining months until January. In the Europa League, Natcho played a vital role of assisting goals in the qualifying round and group stages. He would score three goals in six matches of the Group Stage, against Zulte Waregem and Maribor. In conclusion of the Europa League group stage, UEFA named Natcho in the Team of the Group Stage. Natcho scored a league goal, on 2 December 2013, in a 3–0 win over Amkar Perm.

Natcho was named in the Team of the Season of the Europa League in the 2013–14 season. In the comments on his inclusion, UEFA said: "Probably Rubin's top performer over the last three years, the Israeli international dominates midfield, supplying assists and delivering great set pieces".

In the winter break of the season, it was announced that Natcho would leave the club upon expiry of his contract. Natcho cited the departure of Manager Berdyev as the reason of his departure. After leaving the club, Natcho hinted playing in the Bundesliga since it fits his playing style. Natcho rejected a latest contract from Rubin Kazan despite having increase wages. During his career at Rubin Kazan, he was sometimes referred to as the 'best foreigner' in the Russian league and made 104 appearances and scored 21 times.

PAOK
On 28 January 2014, Natcho arrived in Thessaloniki, Greece, to discuss a possible contract with PAOK. As his contract with Rubin Kazan and sponsorship of 123pame expired he could move to PAOK as a free transfer. The next day Natcho joined the club, signing a six-month contract.

His first goal for the club on 5 February 2014, in a 5–0 win against Crete, followed by his second, in a 2–0 win over Atromitos on 6 April 2014. Having made a good display, Natcho was awarded Player of the Month in March. Natcho would help the club reach the final of Greek Cup, but received a yellow card during the match, which cause him to miss out for the final match.

At the end of the season, it announced that Natcho was released by the club upon expiry of his contract.

CSKA Moscow

After six months at Greece, Natcho returned to Russia, where he joined CSKA Moscow on a four-year contract.

Natcho scored his first goal for the club, which is against his former club, in a 2–1 loss on 18 August 2014. After the match, Natcho felt he owned an apology to Rubin Kazan's supporters. Natcho then scored a hat-trick on 31 August 2014, in a 6–0 win over Rostov. On 21 October 2014, Natcho scored his first Champions League goal for CSKA Moscow with a penalty in the 86th minute against Manchester City. Five days later, Natcho scored a brace, as CSKA Moscow drew 3–3 with FC Ural.

Natcho provided two assists in the 2–1 victory over Manchester City in a Champions League group stage game.

At the end of the 2014–15 season, Natcho scored 12 goals, gave 8 assists, and was placed in the "Team of the Season". He ended the season being the top scorer of CSKA.

In a game against Dynamo Moscow on 5 October 2015 he suffered a slight concussion and was bleeding. Despite that, he insisted on continuing playing (his manager substituted him despite his protests).

He left CSKA upon the expiration of his contract on 2 June 2018.

Olympiacos
After four years at Russia, Natcho returned to Greece, where he joined Olympiacos on a two-year contract. A year later he mutually ended his contract with the club.

Partizan
On 19 August 2019, Natcho signed a three-year contract with Serbian club Partizan and chose the number 6 shirt. He made his Partizan debut three days later coming on as a 73rd-minute sub in the UEFA Europa League play-off game against Molde. His first goals came on 19 September 2019 when he scored a brace in a 2–2 home draw with AZ Alkmaar in the first matchday of the Europa League group stage.

Natcho scored his first Belgrade Derby goal on 10 June 2020, in a 1-0 Serbian Cup semi-final win. He finished his first season in Partizan with 32 appearances, 11 goals and 9 assists, across three competitions.

Natcho scored his second Belgrade Derby goal on 19 September 2021 in a 1–1 home draw Serbian SuperLiga game week 9, the Israeli shot diagonally from the right side with his weaker left leg and shook the net of Milan Borjan. On 12 February 2022, in a 0-2 league win at Radnički Niš, Natcho became only the fourth foreign player in Partizan history to record the 100th official cap.

On 8 July 2022, Natcho acquired Serbian citizenship. Natcho was voted Player of the Week 13 in Serbian SuperLiga after scoring a brace and recording one assist in a 4–1 victory against Vojvodina in Derby of Serbia. Natcho also received 50,000 dinars from the league sponsor to hand over as aid for humanitarian purposes, to whoever he deems in need.

International career

Throughout his career, Natcho has played for nearly every Israeli national team together with his colleague, Beram Kayal. He represented the national team at the Valeri Lobanovsky Memorial Tournament 2007 that was victorious for it. As a former captain of the Israel under-19 football team, Natcho was called up for the Senior team friendly match held 12 August 2009 against Northern Ireland together with fellow club mate Avihai Yadin, but wasn't capped. Natcho made his first appearance for the national team in a friendly game against Romania (3 March 2010), when he came on as a substitute for his former teammate Gil Vermouth. He scored his first international goal against Azerbaijan (7 September 2012).

Career statistics

Club

International

Scores and results list Israel's goal tally first.

Honors
Hapoel Tel Aviv
Israel State Cup: 2006–07

Rubin Kazan
Russian Cup: 2011–12
Russian Super Cup: 2012

CSKA Moscow
Russian Premier League: 2015–16

Individual
Europa League Team of the Group Stage 2013–14
Russian Premier League Top 33 Players: 2011–12, 2014–15

References

External links

Profile at the CSKA Moscow website
Profile at the Israel Football Association website

1988 births
Living people
Footballers from Kfar Kama
Israeli footballers
Association football midfielders
Hapoel Tel Aviv F.C. players
FC Rubin Kazan players
PAOK FC players
PFC CSKA Moscow players
Olympiacos F.C. players
Israeli Premier League players
Russian Premier League players
Super League Greece players
Israel youth international footballers
Israel under-21 international footballers
Israel international footballers
Israeli expatriate footballers
Expatriate footballers in Russia
Expatriate footballers in Greece
Expatriate footballers in Serbia
Israeli expatriate sportspeople in Russia
Israeli expatriate sportspeople in Greece
Israeli expatriate sportspeople in Serbia
Israeli Muslims
Israeli people of Circassian descent
Naturalized citizens of Serbia
Serbian people of Circassian descent